The R.N. Mann House, also known as the Painted Glass House, is a historic house in Franklin County, Tennessee, U.S.. It was built in 1855 for R.N. Mann, an investor in the Falls Mill Manufacturing Company, which operated cotton mills. It remained in the Mann family until 1917, when it was purchased by A. J. Cole.

It has been listed on the National Register of Historic Places since September 22, 1977.

References

National Register of Historic Places in Franklin County, Tennessee
Houses completed in 1855